Troy Industries, Inc. is an American manufacturer of firearms and firearm parts based in Clarksville, Tennessee. It is the manufacturer of parts on the Smith & Wesson M&P15 and is a United States government contractor. Troy is best known for its M14 rifle parts and its M7A1 carbine, which was reviewed by the United States armed forces when drafting requirements for a replacement of the M4 carbine.

Troy Industries sparked a substantial controversy by hiring Dale Monroe, the partner of former FBI sniper Lon Horiuchi.  Horiuchi is infamous for having shot and killed an unarmed Vicki Weaver who was holding a baby at the Ruby Ridge standoff in 1992.  Monroe has testified that had Horiuchi not shot Weaver, he would have done so instead.  Although Monroe and Horiuchi were never prosecuted, Randy Weaver was compensated in a civil settlement for the wrongful death of his wife

References

External links
Troy Industries

Privately held companies based in Tennessee
Firearm manufacturers of the United States
L